The 2016 Atlantic 10 men's basketball tournament was held March 9 through 13, 2016, at the Barclays Center in Brooklyn, New York. The champion earned an automatic bid to the 2016 NCAA tournament.

Seeds
All 14 Atlantic 10 schools participate in the tournament. Teams will be seeded by the 2015–16 Atlantic 10 Conference season record. The top 10 teams received a first round bye and the top four teams received a double bye.

Teams were seeded by record within the conference, with a tiebreaker system to seed teams with identical conference records.

Schedule

*Game times in Eastern Time. #Rankings denote tournament seeding.

Bracket

* denotes overtime period

See also
 2016 Atlantic 10 women's basketball tournament

References

Atlantic 10 men's basketball tournament
2015–16 Atlantic 10 Conference men's basketball season
Basketball in New York City
College sports in New York City
Sports in Brooklyn
Sports competitions in New York City
Atlantic 10 men's basketball tournament
Atlantic 10 men's basketball tournament
2010s in Brooklyn
Prospect Heights, Brooklyn